Adamov (masculine) or Adamova (feminine) may refer to:

Adamov (surname) (fem. Adamova)
Adamov may refer to places in the Czech Republic:
Adamov (Blansko District), a town in the South Moravian Region
Adamov (České Budějovice District), a municipality and village in the South Bohemian Region
Adamov (Kutná Hora District), a municipality and village in the Central Bohemian Region

See also
Adamovo (disambiguation)